Somatina lia is a moth of the  family Geometridae. It is found on the Comoros, La Réunion and Madagascar.

References

Moths described in 1915
Scopulini
Moths of Madagascar
Moths of the Comoros
Moths of Réunion